Badweyn  is a town in the Aynabo District, in the Sool region of Somaliland.

Overview 
Badweyn means "big well" in the Somali language. The town is home to a substantial mosque and a multiple-trunked tree that stands alongside the main road.

See also
Administrative divisions of Somaliland
Regions of Somaliland
Districts of Somaliland
Somalia–Somaliland border

References

Populated places in Sool, Somaliland